Syed Sajjad Hussain (14 January 1920 – 12 January 1995) was a Pakistani-Bangladeshi academic and writer. He served as the 4th Vice-chancellor of the University of Rajshahi.

Early life and education
Hussain was born on 14 January 1920, to a Bengali Muslim family of Syeds in the village of Alokdia in Magura (formerly under Jessore District), Bengal Province. He earned his master's in English from the University of Dhaka in 1942. During his masters studies, the East Pakistan Literary Society was founded with him as chairman. He obtained his Ph.D. from the University of Nottingham in 1952.

Career
Hussain debuted his teaching career at Calcutta Islamic College in 1944. He was a professor at Department of English of the University of Dhaka during 1948–1969. He was then appointed the Vice-Chancellor of the University of Rajshahi in 1969.

Hussain worked as a professor of English at Umm al-Qura University in Mecca, Saudi Arabia during 1975–1985. He moved back to Bangladesh in the late 1980s and lived in Dhaka until his death.

Controversy
Hussain took stance against the separation of East Pakistan as an independent country during the Bangladesh Liberation War. In March 1971, the then Vice-chancellor of the University of Dhaka, Justice Abu Sayed Chowdhury resigned from the post protesting the killing of two students by Pakistani Army. Pakistani Government immediately put Hussain in the vacant position. He was imprisoned after the independence of Bangladesh. While in prison, he wrote his memoir which was later published in 1995 titled "The Wastes of Time: Reflections on the Decline and Fall of East Pakistan". On his release, he moved to England.

Works

English
 Descriptive Catalogue of Bengal Muslims (1960)
 East Pakistan: a Profile (1962)
 Nixed Grill: A Collection of Essays on Religion and Culture (1963)
 Kipling and India: An Inquiry into the Nature and Extent of Kipling's Knowledge of the Indian Sub-Continent (1965)
 Homage to Shakespeare (1965)
 Drama in a Developing Society (1969)
 Books on the Quaid-e-Azam (1969)
 A Guide to Literary Criticism (1983) co-written with Abdel-Hamid El-Khoreiby.
 An Annotated Anthology of English Poetry for Arab Students (1984)
 A Young Muslim's Guide to Religions in the World (1992)
 Civilisation and Society (1994)
 The Wastes of Time: Reflections on the Decline and fall of East Pakistan (1996)

Bengali
 Ma (1960)
 Nirghanta-abhidhana (1970) 
 Ekattorer Smriti (1993)
 Arbi Sahiyer Itibritya

In popular culture
In 2021 Pakistan’s Hum TV released an historical drama based on Hussain’s book Wastes of Times, a miniseries called Khaab Toot Jaatay Hain.

References

1920 births
1995 deaths
People from Magura District
Academic staff of Umm al-Qura University
University of Dhaka alumni
Alumni of the University of Nottingham
Vice-Chancellors of the University of Rajshahi
Vice-Chancellors of the University of Dhaka
Academic staff of the University of Dhaka
Pakistan Movement activists from Bengal
Bangladeshi people of Arab descent
20th-century Bengalis